Fernando De Almeida Vasconcellos (29 December 1919 - November 1996) was a Brazilian chess player. He was a Brazilian Chess Championship silver medalist (1950).

Biography 
De Almeida Vasconcellos participated in twelve Brazilian Chess Championships (1948-1985) and won a silver medal in 1950. In 1951, he represented Brazil in the World Chess Championship South America Zonal tournament.

In 1952 he played for Brazil at the 10th Chess Olympiad in Helsinki, at the second reserve board (+3, =1, -4).

From 1952 to 1954 he led the chess section of the newspaper Diário de Notícias and co-edited Chess Carioca magazine.

In 1977, he won the Brasília City Chess Championship, and in 1989 won the Brazilian Senior Chess Championship.

In his later career, he developed and actively applied the Réti opening variation 1. Nf3 Nf6 2. a4.

References

External links

Fernando De Almeida Vasconcellos chess games at 365Chess.com

1919 births
1996 deaths
Sportspeople from Rio de Janeiro (city)
Brazilian chess players
Chess Olympiad competitors